Can We Help? is a factual Australian television series hosted by Peter Rowsthorn.

Its sixth and final season was in 2011 when it was broadcast on ABC1 at 6.00pm on Saturdays. The program is driven by viewer questions and requests for help in regard to a wide range of subjects. The show specializes in reuniting families and loved ones and granting simple wishes to those in need, but over the years has introduced many other segments with a strong sense of history and helping others.

The show debuted on 6 June 2006 to low ratings (approximately 200,000 viewers, Nash). However, by the end of 2007 the figures had climbed to approximately 490,000 viewers Nash (not including Tas and Reeg).

Regular expert presenters include Kate Burridge, Christian Horgan, Dr Norman Swan, Dr Karl Kruszelnicki and Tanya Ha.
The program encourages people to send in questions and interact with the show and "helping" community via the show's website plus Facebook and Twitter pages.
The program contains closed captions within its broadcast signal and is classified G (General).

External links
 https://web.archive.org/web/20080710031048/http://www.abc.net.au/tv/canwehelp/
 https://www.facebook.com/pages/Can-We-Help
 https://www.twitter.com/ABCCanWeHelp

Australian Broadcasting Corporation original programming
Australian non-fiction television series
2006 Australian television series debuts
2010s Australian television series